The 2012 Harlow District Council election took place on 3 May 2012 to elect members of Harlow District Council in Essex, England. One third of the council was up for election and the Labour Party gained overall control of the council from the Conservative Party.

After the election, the composition of the council was:
Labour 20
Conservative 13

Background
After the last election in 2011 the Conservatives remained in control of the council with 17 councillors, compared to 14 for Labour and 2 for the Liberal Democrats. However, in October 2011 one of the two Liberal Democrat councillors, John Strachan of Staple Tye ward defected to the Labour party.

Harlow was reported in the national press to be one of Labour's top targets in the 2012 local elections.

Election result
The Labour Party gained control of Harlow from the Conservatives after gaining 5 seats including 4 from the Conservatives. The Labour gains from the Conservatives came in Harlow Common, Little Parndon and Hare Street, Netteswell and Toddbrook and meant Labour won 8 of the 12 seats contested. The Conservatives had controlled the council since winning a majority at the 2008 election.

The other Labour gain came from the Liberal Democrats in Mark Hall ward and meant the Liberal Democrats no longer had any councillors in Harlow. The Liberal Democrats did not come close to taking any of the seats contested, with some candidates getting less than 100 votes. Overall turnout at the election was 28.43%, the lowest turnout ever for a local election in Harlow.

Ward results

Bush Fair (2 seats)

Church Langley

Great Parndon

Harlow Common

Little Parndon and Hare Street

Mark Hall

Netteswell

Old Harlow

Staple Tye

Summers and Kingsmoor

Toddbrook

By-elections between 2012 and 2014
A by-election was held in Toddbrook on 15 November 2012 after Labour councillor Bob Davis resigned from the council. The seat was held for Labour by Christine O'Dell with a majority of 221 votes over the Conservatives.

References

Harlow District Council elections
2012 English local elections
2010s in Essex